The 1980 Vermont gubernatorial election took place on November 4, 1980. Incumbent Republican Richard A. Snelling ran successfully for a third term as Governor of Vermont, defeating Democratic candidate M. Jerome Diamond.

, this marks the most recent time that Republicans won the races for Governor and for President concurrently.

Republican primary

Results

Democratic primary

Results

Liberty Union primary

Results

General election

Results

References

Vermont
1980
Gubernatorial